Lisa Miller (born 1963) is an American writer and journalist. She is currently a contributing editor for New York. Formerly a senior editor of Newsweek and a religion columnist for The Washington Post, Miller is a Wilbur Prize-winning author and a commentator on religion, history, and religious faith.

She has written Newsweek cover stories on Barack Obama, Mitt Romney, and Sarah Palin, as well as several New York cover stories on social trends.

Personal life
Born in Cleveland, Ohio, Miller was raised in a secular Jewish home. She attended Oberlin College in Oberlin, Ohio, graduating in English in 1984. She worked at the Harvard Business Review, The New Yorker, and The Wall Street Journal.

Miller was married to her husband in an interfaith ceremony performed by an Episcopalian priest who worked with a rabbi on the ceremony. After the birth of her daughter, Miller joined a Jewish temple for reasons of "blood and history and culture". She describes this religious community as a "progressive, inclusive congregation."

Career
Miller has worked as a writer and editor at the Harvard Business Review, The New Yorker, and The Wall Street Journal. She joined Newsweek as society editor in July 2000, becoming the religion editor and columnist in October 2006. Miller has also been the religion columnist for The Washington Post and is currently a contributing editor for New York.

Books
 Heaven: Our Enduring Fascination with the Afterlife (2010) , a history and personal memoir exploring the idea of heaven in Western culture.

References

External links
 Excerpt from 'Heaven' at Newsweek.com
 Newsweek Cover Our Mutual Joy: Gay Marriage in America
 Newsweek Cover ''Finding His Faith: An Interview with Barack Obama
 Index of articles and essays by Lisa Miller at New York Magazine
 Archive of Lisa Miller's religion column at the Washington Post
 Index of articles and essays by Lisa Miller at Newsweek.com
 Archive of video appearances, articles and essays by Lisa Miller

1963 births
Living people
American magazine editors
News editors
American women journalists
Newsweek people
Writers from Cleveland
Jewish American writers
Oberlin College alumni
Women magazine editors
21st-century American Jews
21st-century American women